The Cercle des Femmes Peintres was a society for women artists in Brussels, active during the years 1888–1893. This society was meant to be a local version of the Paris-based Union des Femmes Peintres et Sculpteurs.

Eugénie Beauvois, a still-life painter, was named the vice chairman at the start, which was an idea formed by Berthe Art. Most of the ladies who joined had previously been refused a seat at all other official artist societies due to their sex.

Among the members were Jeanne Adrighetti, Alix d'Anethan, Berthe Art, Marie de Bièvre , Marguérite Dielman, Mathilde Dupré-Lesprit, Mary Gasparioli, Marie Heijermans, Pauline Jamar, Rosa Leigh, Alice Ronner, Emma Ronner, Rosa Venneman, Marguerite Verboeckhoven and Emma Verwee.

They organized four exhibitions in 1888, 1890, 1891 and 1893. All members were women amateurs.

References 
 Cercle des Femmes Peintres (tentoonstellingscatalogus), Brussel (Musée de Peinture Moderne), 1890.
 (French) La Jeune Belgique, 1890: Chronique Artistique: commentaar op de tentoonstelling van de"Cercle des Femmes Peintres"

Culture in Brussels
Women's organisations based in Belgium
Belgian artist groups and collectives